The 1985 Pau Grand Prix was a Formula 3000 motor race held on 27 May 1985 at the Pau circuit, in Pau, Pyrénées-Atlantiques, France.

Classification

Qualifying 
Emanuele Pirro took pole position with a time of 1:12.650.

Race 
Christian Danner won the Grand Prix, with Emanuele Pirro in second and Lamberto Leoni in third.

References

Pau Grand Prix
1985 in French motorsport